Marci Lobel is a health psychologist known for her research on women's reproductive health, effects of prenatal stress on pregnancy and newborn health, and how mothers learn to cope with stress.

Lobel holds the position of Professor of Social and Health Psychology in Stony Brook University.

Biography 
Lobel completed her undergraduate degree in Psychology and Social Relations with the highest honors (summa cum laude) at Harvard University.  Lobel attended university with the idea that she would become a pediatrician, but as she attained experience with psychological science, she decided to follow a research path. She subsequently completed her master's degree and Ph.D. (1989) in Social & Health Psychology at the University of California, Los Angeles.  Christine Dunkel-Schetter was her mentor at UCLA. Lobel and Dunkel-Schetter conducted studies about social support during pregnancy and postpartum depression, prenatal maternal stress and preterm birth, and psychological reactions to infertility. While at UCLA, Lobel also worked with Shelley E. Taylor on research on social comparison.

Lobel holds the position of Professor of Psychology at Stony Brook University where she teaches social and health psychology. She was a recipient of Stony Brook University's Dean's Award for Excellence in Graduate Mentoring by a Faculty Member (2011) and the Department of Psychology Teacher of the Year Award (2010-2011).

Awards 
Lobel was awarded the American Psychological Association (APA) Bonnie R. Strickland and Jessica Henderson Daniel Distinguished Mentoring Award in 2008,  the APA Committee on Women in Psychology Leadership Award in 2016, and the Excellence in Health Psychology Mentoring Award from the Society for Health Psychology in 2021. Her 2016 APA award citation noted her "distinguished and vital contributions to social psychological theory, to understanding stress, and to a theory of gendered racism."

Research 
Lobel's research focuses on women's reproductive health and how emotions, behaviors, and physical conditions affect pregnancy and birth outcomes. She has made contributions to research on racial disparities in birth outcomes, and outcomes of assisted reproductive technology.

Lobel is the Senior Researcher and Director of the Stress and Reproduction (STAR) Lab, where her colleagues and graduate students are studying stress related to the COVID-19 pandemic and its effects on pregnant women and their babies. The COVID-19 Pregnancy Experiences (COPE) study aims to brings insight into how pregnant women used coping strategies during the pandemic. The STAR lab is also conducting research to improve identification of risk factors that may affect treatment and treatment outcomes among pregnant women, including those with opioid use disorder.

Representative publications 
 Lobel, M. (1994). Conceptualizations, measurement, and effects of prenatal maternal stress on birth outcomes. Journal of Behavioral Medicine, 17(3), 225–272.
 Lobel, M., Cannella, D. L., Graham, J. E., DeVincent, C., Schneider, J., & Meyer, B. A. (2008). Pregnancy-specific stress, prenatal health behaviors, and birth outcomes. Health Psychology, 27(5), 604–615.
 Lobel, M., & DeLuca, R. S. (2007). Psychosocial sequelae of cesarean delivery: review and analysis of their causes and implications. Social Science & Medicine, 64(11), 2272–2284.
 Lobel, M., DeVincent, C. J., Kaminer, A., & Meyer, B. A. (2000). The impact of prenatal maternal stress and optimistic disposition on birth outcomes in medically high-risk women. Health Psychology, 19(6), 544–553.
 Lobel, M., Dunkel-Schetter, C., & Scrimshaw, S. C. (1992). Prenatal maternal stress and prematurity: a prospective study of socioeconomically disadvantaged women. Health Psychology, 11(1), 32–40.

References

External links 

 Faculty Profile at Stony Book University
 Stress and Reproduction (STAR) Lab
 

American women psychologists
21st-century American psychologists
Fellows of the American Psychological Association
Stony Brook University faculty
Harvard University alumni
University of California, Los Angeles alumni
Living people
Year of birth missing (living people)
American women academics
21st-century American women